Vernon Township is one of the sixteen townships of Scioto County, Ohio, United States.  The 2010 census counted 2,129 people in the township.

Geography
Located in the southeastern part of the county, it borders the following townships:
Bloom Township - north
Decatur Township, Lawrence County - east
Elizabeth Township, Lawrence County - southeast
Green Township - southwest
Porter Township - west
Harrison Township - northwest corner

No municipalities are located in Vernon Township.

Name and history
Statewide, other Vernon Townships are located in Clinton, Crawford, and Trumbull counties.

Vernon Township was organized in 1818. The township derives its name from Mount Vernon, the estate of George Washington.

In 1833, Vernon Township contained a blast steam furnace for melting ore, one gristmill and one saw mill, three stores, and a tanyard.

Government
The township is governed by a three-member board of trustees, who are elected in November of odd-numbered years to a four-year term beginning on the following January 1. Two are elected in the year after the presidential election and one is elected in the year before it. There is also an elected township fiscal officer, who serves a four-year term beginning on April 1 of the year after the election, which is held in November of the year before the presidential election. Vacancies in the fiscal officership or on the board of trustees are filled by the remaining trustees.

References

External links
County website

Townships in Scioto County, Ohio
Townships in Ohio